Joo Swn-Lan  (born ) is a retired South Korean female volleyball player. She was part of the South Korea women's national volleyball team.

She participated in the 1994 FIVB Volleyball Women's World Championship. She attended Seong-am Girls' Commercial High School (성암여자상업고등학교) in Seoul, and went on to play at the club level for Hyosung.

Clubs
 Hyosung (1994)

References

1974 births
Living people
South Korean women's volleyball players
Place of birth missing (living people)
Asian Games medalists in volleyball
Volleyball players at the 1994 Asian Games
Asian Games gold medalists for South Korea
Medalists at the 1994 Asian Games